Anton Erhard Martinelli (1684 – September 15, 1747) was an Austrian architect and master-builder of Italian descent.

Martinelli was born in Vienna. He was the son of architect Franz Martinelli.

Anton Erhard Martinelli supervised the construction of several important buildings in Vienna, such as the Karlskirche and the Palais Schwarzenberg or the remodelling of the Deutschordenskirche. He designed the plans of the Palais Thinnfeld in Graz and of Invalidenhaus (Invalidus-palota) in Budapest, now the city hall.

In cooperation with his brother Johann Baptist Martinelli, he also designed the plans of several baroque churches in the Habsburg empire, among which Holy Trinity Cathedral in Blaj and carried out work for the estates of the Esterházy family (such as the country house in Fertőd) He also worked on the Lanschütz mansion (in Bernolákovo) and the Veľký Biel mansion in Western Slovakia, and the restoration of the Dvorac Zrinskih (Zrinski Castle) of the Croatian counts in Čakovec, Croatia.

He died in Vienna in 1747.

Works 
 Karlskirche in Vienna
 Palais Schwarzenberg in Vienna
 Deutschordenkirche in Vienna.
 Invalidenhaus (Invalidus-palota) in Budapest
 Holy Trinity Cathedral in Blaj
 Castle of Vranov nad Dyjí
 Castle of Hluboká nad Vltavou
 Esterházy country house in Fertőd
 Lanschütz mansion (in Bernolákovo)
 Veľký Biel mansion
 Dvorac Zrinskih (Zrinski Castle) in Čakovec
 Palais Thinnfeld in Graz
 Neuwartenburg Castle in Timelkam
 St.Jacob Church in Kostelec na Hane
 [[Town hall]] in České Budějovice

References 

 Anton Erhard Martinelli 
 Anton Martinelli 
 Dvorac Zrinskih 
 Dehio-Handbuch, Die Österreichischen Kunstdenkmäler, Graz, 1979
 Baroque mansion in Veľký Biel, Western Slovakia 
 Martinelli, Anton Erhard - Artportal 
 History 1450–1789: Art in Central Europe 

Austrian Baroque architects
Austrian people of Italian descent
Architects from Vienna
1684 births
1747 deaths
18th-century Austrian people